"Heart Strings" is a country music song written by Merle Moore, sung by Eddy Arnold, and released on the RCA Victor label. In October 1951, it reached No. 5 on the country best seller chart. It spent 12 weeks on the charts and was the No. 22 best selling country record of 1951.

See also
 Billboard Top Country & Western Records of 1951

References

Eddy Arnold songs
1951 songs